This is a list of flags that are inscribed with English-language text.

#

A

B

C

D

E

F

G

H

I

J

K

L

M

N

O

P

Q

R

S

T

U

V

W

X

Y

Z

See also
List of inscribed flags

Notes

English language
Flags